Mount Solomons is a peak in the Sierra Nevada mountain range in the U.S. state of California.  It rises to  directly above Muir Pass.  Mount Solomons was named after Theodore Solomons, an explorer of the Sierra Nevada mountains, who mapped and established what is now the northern half of John Muir Trail.

The peak is on the Goddard Divide in Kings Canyon National Park and overlooks Evolution Basin. A scramble from the Muir trail at Muir pass leads to the summit.

See also
 Mount Goddard
 Black Giant

References 

Mountains of Kings Canyon National Park
Mountains of the Sierra Nevada (United States)
Mountains of Fresno County, California
Mountains of Northern California